Yevgeniy ("Danny") Krasnov (born 27 May 1970 in Moscow, Russian SFSR) is a retired Israeli pole vaulter. He emigrated from the Soviet Union in 1991.

His personal best is 5.75 metres, achieved in August 1994 in Brussels. The current Israeli record belongs to Aleksandr Averbukh with 5.93 metres.

Achievements

References

External links
 

1970 births
Living people
Russian emigrants to Israel
Israeli male pole vaulters
Soviet male pole vaulters
Athletes (track and field) at the 1992 Summer Olympics
Athletes (track and field) at the 1996 Summer Olympics
Athletes (track and field) at the 2000 Summer Olympics
Olympic athletes of Israel
Athletes from Moscow